Allan E. Day is a retired United States Air Force major general who recently served as the director of logistics operations of the Defense Logistics Agency. Previously, he was the director of logistics, civil engineering, force protection, and nuclear integration of the Air Force Materiel Command.

References

External links

Year of birth missing (living people)
Living people
Place of birth missing (living people)
United States Air Force generals